Wausau is a town in Washington County, Florida,  United States. The population was 383 at the 2010 census.

Geography

The town is located in the Florida panhandle along Florida State Road 77, which is the main route through the town. FL-77 leads north 11 mi (18 km) to Chipley, the Washington County seat, and south 36 mi (58 km) to Panama City.

Demographics

As of the census of 2000, there were 398 people, 163 households, and 106 families residing in the town. The racial makeup of the town was 94.47% White, 0.50% African American, 0.75% Native American, 0.25% Asian, 0.50% from other races, and 3.52% from two or more races. Hispanic or Latino of any race were 2.51% of the population.

There were 163 households, out of which 27.6% had children under the age of 18 living with them, 47.9% were married couples living together, 12.9% had a female householder with no husband present, and 34.4% were non-families. 30.1% of all households were made up of individuals, and 15.3% had someone living alone who was 65 years of age or older.  The average household size was 2.44 and the average family size was 3.04.

In the town, the population was spread out, with 26.9% under the age of 18, 8.3% from 18 to 24, 24.1% from 25 to 44, 24.1% from 45 to 64, and 16.6% who were 65 years of age or older.  The median age was 37 years. For every 100 females, there were 94.1 males.  For every 100 females age 18 and over, there were 89.0 males.

The median income for a household in the town was $21,000, and the median income for a family was $23,000. Males had a median income of $20,481 versus $21,563 for females. The per capita income for the town was $10,722.  About 25.0% of families and 29.2% of the population were below the poverty line, including 35.2% of those under age 18 and 19.7% of those age 65 or over.

Trivia
Wausau is the "Possum Capital of the World" and celebrates annually with the Wausau Possum Festival, a celebration of the Virginia opossum.

See also

References

External links

Towns in Washington County, Florida
Towns in Florida